Bărbătești is a commune located in Vâlcea County, Oltenia, Romania. It is composed of four villages: Bodești, Bărbătești, Bârzești, and Negrulești.

The commune is situated in the central part of the county,  from the county seat, Râmnicu Vâlcea. It borders to the north and west Costești commune, to the south Pietrari commune, and to the east Stoenești commune and the town of Băile Olănești.

Part of the Buila-Vânturarița National Park is situated on the territory of the commune.

Natives
 Nadia Ileana Bogorin

References

Communes in Vâlcea County
Localities in Oltenia